{| class="sortable wikitable" style="width: 50%; font-size: 0.90em;"
! Rank !! Towns !! Population (2011) !! Area in km2 !! Density in km2
|-
| 1 || Kanhangad || 73,342|| 39.54  || 1854.4
|-
| 2 || Kasaragod || 54,172|| 16.7 || 3243.8
|-
| 3 || Nileshwar ||41,553 || 26.23 || 2100
|-
| 4 || Uppala ||41,212 || 25.04 || 1650   
|-  
| 5 || Trikaripur ||41,202  || 27.3 || 1509
|-
| 6 || Kumbla  ||35,034|| 23.2 || 1510.1
|- 
| 7 || Cheruvathur ||27,435  || 18.37 || 1493.5
|- 
| 8 || Bekal ||22,449  || 10.934|| 2053.14
|-

 
Kasaragod
Kerala geography-related lists